William Jennings Wallace (August 6, 1895 – July 7, 1977) was a highly decorated aviation officer of the United States Marine Corps with the rank of lieutenant general. He is most noted for his service as commanding officer of MAG-22 at Midway and MAG-23 at Guadalcanal and the Air Defense Command during the Battle of Okinawa.

Early years

Wallace was born on August 6, 1895, in Church Hill, Maryland, and later attended Washington College in Chestertown, Maryland, where he graduated with Bachelor of Science degree in May 1917. He almost immediately enlisted in the Marine Corps on May 15, 1917, and was assigned to the Officer Candidates School at Marine Barracks Quantico, Virginia. Wallace graduated from the officer's school on June 15, 1918, and was commissioned second lieutenant on the same date.

World War II

In March 1941, Wallace was transferred to Oahu, Hawaii, where he was appointed executive officer of the Marine Aircraft Group 21 based at Ewa Field under the command of Colonel Claude A. Larkin. Wallace was present at the time of the Japanese attack on Pearl Harbor and participated in the defense of the Ewa Field. He remained in this capacity until March 1942, when he was transferred to the command of newly activated Marine Aircraft Group 22 at Midway Atoll.

However, he was relieved by Colonel Ira L. Kimes in April 1942 and appointed commanding officer of the Marine Aircraft Group 23. He was also promoted to the rank of colonel on May 21, 1942. Wallace led MAG 23 during the Guadalcanal Campaign until 13 October 1942, when he was wounded by heavy-caliber naval shell during a Japanese bombardment of American positions. He distinguished himself while serving there and was decorated with the Legion of Merit with Combat "V". Wallace was evacuated to United States for recovery and he was pronounced fit for duty in February 1943. He was subsequently appointed chief of staff of the Marine Fleet Air, West Coast based at San Diego, California, under the command of Brigadier General Lewie G. Merritt.

Wallace was promoted to the rank of brigadier general on December 5, 1943, and succeeded General Merritt as Commanding General Marine Fleet Air, West Coast in January 1944. In this capacity, he was responsible for activation of all Navy and Marine Corps aviation units on the West Coast. At the end of May 1944, Wallace was transferred to Naval Station Pearl Harbor, where he was appointed Chief of staff of Aircraft, Fleet Marine Force, Pacific under the command of Major General Ross E. Rowell and later Francis P. Mulcahy. For his service in this capacity, Wallace was decorated with the Bronze Star Medal with Combat "V" in late 1944.

In March 1945, General Wallace was transferred back to the Pacific Theater and assumed command of Air Defense Command and Fighter Command within Tactical Air Force, Tenth Army. He participated in Battle of Okinawa with this command and distinguished himself, when went ashore and personally directed the air operations against enemy. Units under his command destroyed over 500 enemy's aircraft. For his service on Okinawa, Wallace was decorated with the Navy Distinguished Service Medal.

Navy Distinguished Service Medal citation

Postwar career

General Wallace was transferred back to the United States in August 1945 to take again command of the Marine Air, West Coast. He relieved Brigadier General Ivan W. Miller on August 15 and was promoted to the rank of major general on the same date. Wallace served in this capacity for one year, before he was succeeded by Major General Louis E. Woods in August 1946 and was subsequently appointed commanding general aircraft, Fleet Marine Force, Pacific. He succeeded Major General James T. Moore in this capacity.

Wallace was transferred to the Marine Corps Air Station Cherry Point, North Carolina, in September 1947 and took command of Aircraft, Fleet Marine Force, Atlantic. He also served simultaneously as commanding general of 2nd Marine Aircraft Wing based there. On 24 February 1948, Wallace was transferred to the Headquarters Marine Corps in Washington, D.C., to be appointed Director of Marine Corps Aviation. He succeeded Major General Field Harris in this capacity and served there until the beginning of September 1950, when he was relieved by Brigadier General Clayton C. Jerome.

His final assignment was again as commanding general aircraft, Fleet Marine Force, Pacific with headquarters at Marine Corps Air Station El Toro, California. Wallace finally retired from the Marine Corps on July 1, 1952, and was advanced to the rank of lieutenant general on the retired list for having been specially commended in combat.

Wallace died on July 7, 1977, and is buried at Arlington National Cemetery, Virginia, together with his wife Fannie Grant Macy Wallace (1905–1993).

Decorations

Here is the ribbon bar of Lieutenant General William J. Wallace:

References

1895 births
1977 deaths
Military personnel from Maryland
People from Queen Anne's County, Maryland
Washington College alumni
Air Corps Tactical School alumni
United States Naval Aviators
United States Marine Corps generals
United States Marine Corps personnel of World War I
United States Marine Corps World War II generals
Recipients of the Navy Distinguished Service Medal
Recipients of the Legion of Merit
Burials at Arlington National Cemetery